The Royal Academy of Performing Arts (RAPA) is a Bhutanese government body within the Ministry of Home and Cultural Affairs, Department of Culture, that supports the preservation of traditional Bhutanese culture. It was founded in 1954 under the initiative of the Third Druk Gyalpo Jigme Dorji Wangchuck. In 1967, it was institutionalised as an academy and the Royal Dance troupe was its creation. The Academy is located in Thimphu, along Chhophel Lam.

Activities
The Academy trains young dancers and musicians in both religious and secular folk music and dance. The Academy also documents and performs live songs and dances from Bhutan's many diverse regions – from modern rigsar to centuries-old genres – and publishes its collections.

The professional dancers of the Academy hold performances during the annual Thimphu Tsechu dance festival held at Tashichho Dzong. Throughout the year, its members give one-hour performances for guests and tour groups on request. The Academy also hosts public dance practices ahead of major events, such as the 2011 royal wedding, and performs abroad.

Leaders of the Academy further participate in international private nonprofit organizations promoting and preserving traditional Bhutanese music and culture.

See also
Music of Bhutan
Culture of Bhutan

References

Bhutanese culture